Robert Kent (born October 6, 1980) is an American football quarterback. He played college football at Jackson State. He has also been a member of the Tennessee Titans, Montreal Alouettes, Birmingham/Alabama Steeldogs, Lubbock Renegades, Toronto Argonauts, Oklahoma City Yard Dawgz, Abilene Ruff Riders, Houston Stallions, Corpus Christi Fury, San Antonio Talons, St. Louis Attack, Texas Revolution, Dallas Marshals, Monterrey Steel, Massachusetts Pirates, and Duke City Gladiators. He also was the head coach of the Duke City Gladiators in the Indoor Football League (IFL) for the remainder of the 2021 season.

Early years
Kent played high school football for the Gentry High School Rams of Indianola, Mississippi. He earned All-State honors as a senior, throwing for 2,883 yards and 30 touchdowns. He also lettered in track, basketball and tennis.

College career
Kent was a four-year starter at quarterback for the Jackson State Tigers of Jackson State University. In 45 games, he completed 825 of 1539 passes for 11,797 yards, 104 touchdowns and 58 interceptions, averaging 262.16 yards per game. His 11,797 yards passing ranked fourth in NCAA Division I-AA history. Kent was a finalist for the Conerly Trophy in 2002. He participated in the final Blue–Gray Football Classic in 2003.

Professional career
Kent was rated the 18th best quarterback in the 2004 NFL Draft by NFLDraftScout.com.

Kent signed with the Tennessee Titans on April 26, 2004 after going undrafted in the 2004 NFL Draft. He was released by the Titans on August 29, 2004.

He signed with the Montreal Alouettes in January 2005. He was released by the Alouettes on June 17, 2005.

He played for the Birmingham/Alabama Steeldogs of the af2 from 2006 to 2007. He completed 44 of 88 passes for 462 yards and five touchdowns in three games for the Steeldogs in 2007. He also rushed for 65 yards and three touchdowns.

Kent was traded to the Lubbock Renegades in April 2007. He completed 240 of 427 pass attempts for 3,535 yards, 81 touchdowns and 14 interceptions. He also rushed for 11 touchdowns on 174 yards.

He signed with the Toronto Argonauts on August 6, 2007. He was released by the Argonauts on August 30, 2007.

He played for the Lubbock Renegades during the 2008 af2 season. He helped the team to its first playoff berth while completing 274-of-505 passes for 4,100 yards, 86 touchdowns and 8 interceptions. He was also the team’s second leading rusher with 189 yards and 16 touchdowns.

Kent signed with the Oklahoma City Yard Dawgz in October 2008 and played for them during the 2009 af2 season.

He signed with the Abilene Ruff Riders of the Indoor Football League in April 2010.

He played for the Houston Stallions from 2011 to 2012. He recorded a 19–1 record while starting for the Stallions.

Kent signed with the Corpus Christi Fury of the Ultimate Indoor Football League in February 2013. He helped the Fury advance to the Ultimate Indoor Football League championship game in the team’s inaugural season. He also led the Ultimate Indoor Football League in passing and led the Fury in rushing during the 2013 season.

He signed with the San Antonio Talons on July 25, 2013. He started one game for the Talons during the 2013 season.

He re-signed with the Fury and played for the team during the 2014 UIFL season.

Kent also played for the St. Louis Attack of X-League Indoor Football during the 2014 season. The Attack finished the regular season undefeated and lost to the Florida Marine Raiders in X-Bowl I.

He signed with the Texas Revolution of Champions Indoor Football (CIF) in 2014 and played for the team during the CIF's inaugural season in 2015. He was named the 2016 CIF MVP and Offensive Player of the Year. He was released on March 23, 2017. On March 23, 2017, he signed with the Dallas Marshals. On June 3, 2017, Kent signed with the Monterrey Steel.

On April 19, 2018, he signed with the Massachusetts Pirates.

Kent later signed with the Richmond Roughriders in 2018.

Personal life
Kent was the stunt double for Dwayne Johnson in The Game Plan.

References

External links
Just Sports Stats
Robert Kent trading cards

Living people
1980 births
Players of American football from Mississippi
American football quarterbacks
Canadian football quarterbacks
African-American players of American football
African-American players of Canadian football
Jackson State Tigers football players
Alabama Steeldogs players
Lubbock Renegades players
Toronto Argonauts players
Oklahoma City Yard Dawgz players
Abilene Ruff Riders players
Houston Stallions players
Corpus Christi Fury players
San Antonio Talons players
River City Raiders players
Texas Revolution players
Mesquite Marshals players
Monterrey Steel players
Massachusetts Pirates players
American Arena League players
People from Indianola, Mississippi
21st-century African-American sportspeople
20th-century African-American people